Below are the complete results of the men's singles tennis competition during the 1984 Summer Olympics in Los Angeles, when tennis was re-introduced as a demonstration sport.

Seeds

Draw

Finals

Top half

Bottom half

References
 ITF results

Men's singles
Men's events at the 1984 Summer Olympics